Wing Commander Alexander Coultate Rabagliati   (1914 – 6 July 1943) known as Sandy was a Scottish flying ace of World War II, credited with 21 'kills'.

Born in Scotland, not in South Africa as previously recorded.  His great grandfather was an Italian revolutionary from Genoa, who took refuge in Scotland, married a pastor's daughter and settled there.

Educated at Charterhouse School he joined the RAF in 1935. After training was posted to 1 Squadron before moving to 27 Squadron in India in December 1936. He returned to England in 1939, joining No. 1 Anti-Aircraft Co-operation Unit. In 1940 he converted to Hurricanes and joined 46 Squadron, taking command in December 1940.

He returned to England for a stint at Fighter Command Headquarters. In 1943 he became Wing Leader of RAF Coltishall.

During a shipping strike, flying with 195 Squadron on 6 July 1943, his Typhoon was hit by flak and he crashed in the sea.

References

1914 births
1943 deaths
People educated at Charterhouse School
British World War II flying aces
Scottish flying aces
Recipients of the Distinguished Flying Cross (United Kingdom)
Rabagliati
Royal Air Force squadron leaders
Aviators killed by being shot down
Scottish people of Italian descent